The 1968 New Mexico Lobos football team was an American football team that represented the University of New Mexico in the Western Athletic Conference (WAC) during the 1968 NCAA University Division football season.  In their first season under head coach Rudy Feldman, the Lobos compiled a 0–10 record (0–7 against WAC opponents) and were outscored, 403 to 120.

David Harris, Ace Hendricks, and John Pautsch were the team captains. The team's statistical leaders included Terry Stone with 769 passing yards, David Bookert with 872 rushing yards and 60 points scored, and Bob Fowler with 265 receiving yards.

Schedule

References

New Mexico
New Mexico Lobos football seasons
College football winless seasons
New Mexico Lobos football